Erika Diettes (born 1978) is a Colombian visual artist. She attended the Universidad de los Andes Bogota and the Pontificia Universidad Javeriana Bogotá.

Diettes is best known for her series of portraits of women who were forced to witness the torture of their loved ones during the Colombian conflict. Her work is included in the collections of the Museum of Fine Arts Houston and the Santa Barbara Museum of Art.

References

External links 

Erika Diettes: A Poet of Grief and Humanity interview in Talking Pictures magazine

Living people
1978 births
21st-century photographers
21st-century Colombian women artists